FCMC may refer to:

 FC Morangis-Chilly, a football club in France
 First Congregational Methodist Church, a Methodist Christian denomination in the United States